Kuo Yuan Ye is a chain of pastry stores in Taiwan. Kuo Yuan Ye pastry is prepared with skills passed down through generations. In 1708, ancestors of the Kuo family left their native home in Fujian, China, crossed the Taiwan Strait, and arrived in what is now known as Taipei. In 1867, Kuo Liang-chen built a squat mudbrick shop in Shilin, Taipei, where he started a pastry business. In memory of his hometown ancestral hall, he gave his store the same name, “Yuan Ye”. From a small shop with no signboard, Kuo Yuan Ye has grown to become renowned for its dedication to preserving the traditional Taiwanese culture and offering aesthetic pastries. Many well known favorites are the wedding gift box, bride cake, pineapple cake, moon cake, and various Taiwanese pastries.

In order to preserve the rich historical asset of Taiwanese pastry, Kuo Yuan Ye established the first museum of cake and pastry in 2001. Kuo Yuan Ye Museum of Cake and Pastry besides displays the art and development of pastry and cake of Taiwan, the custom of wedding and pastry, festival ceremony and each stage of one’s life, Kuo Yuan Ye Museum of Cake and Pastry also lets guests to experience making Taiwanese cakes and pastries. The museum has two branches in Taiwan, one in Shilin District, Taipei and another in Yangmei District, Taoyuan City.

Transportation
The store is accessible within walking distance north from Shilin Station of the Taipei Metro.

References

 English | 郭元益 Kuo Yuan Ye Retrieved 2014-04-17.
 Kuo Yuan Ye:::- TAIPEITRAVEL.NET - Department of Information and Tourism, Taipei City Government" Taipeitravel.net. Retrieved 2014-04-17.

External links

 

Restaurant franchises
Food and drink companies of Taiwan
Taiwanese pastries
Taiwanese brands